Patrick Joseph Magee (born 1951) is a former Provisional Irish Republican Army member, best known for planting a bomb in the Brighton Grand Hotel targeting Prime Minister Margaret Thatcher and her Cabinet, which killed five people. He is often referred to as the "Brighton bomber".

Early life and IRA career 
Patrick Magee was born in Belfast and moved with his family to Norwich when he was two years old. He returned to Belfast at the age of 18 in 1969 and later joined the Provisional IRA.

He was interned without trial at Long Kesh between June 1973 and November 1975.

Brighton hotel bombing

The plot to bomb the Grand Hotel had started as an act of revenge for the stance the British government had taken over the 1981 Irish hunger strike.

Magee had stayed in the hotel under the false name of Roy Walsh four weeks previously, during the weekend of 14–17 September 1984. He planted the bomb, with a long-delay timer, in the bathroom wall of his room, number 629. The bomb exploded at 2:54 a.m. on 12 October 1984, killing five people and injuring 34. He was arrested in the Queen's Park area of Glasgow on 22 June 1985 with four other IRA members, including Martina Anderson, while planning other bombings in England. At his trial in September 1986, he received eight life sentences, with the judge branding him "a man of exceptional cruelty and inhumanity." Many years later, in August 2000, Magee admitted to The Guardian that he carried out the bombing, but told them he did not accept he left a fingerprint on the registration card, saying "If that was my fingerprint I did not put it there". While in prison, he completed a PhD examining the representation of Irish republicans in "Troubles" fiction. In August 1997, he married for a second time.

After prison 
Magee was released from prison in 1999, having served 14 years, under the terms of the Good Friday Agreement. Originally he was sentenced to eight life sentences and a minimum tariff of 35 years. Jack Straw, the then Home Secretary, attempted to block Magee's release, but this attempt was overturned by the High Court.

He continues to defend his role in the blast, but he has expressed remorse for the loss of innocent lives. One of the victims of the bombing was Sir Anthony Berry, whose daughter Jo Berry publicly met Magee in November 2000 in an effort at achieving reconciliation. They have met several dozen times since that date.

Harvey Thomas, a senior adviser to Thatcher who survived the bombing, forgave Magee in 1998. Thomas has since developed a friendship with Magee, including hosting him in his own home. Thomas cited his Christian faith as the reason why he felt compelled to forgive. Norman Tebbit, whose wife was paralysed in the Brighton bombing, has asserted that he could only forgive Magee if he went to the police and provided them with the names of anyone else who was responsible for the bombing. He has argued that giving up violence is insufficient, stating: "If Dr. Shipman had announced he was not going to murder any more of his patients, I don't think we would have felt that was a case for going 'good old Shipman' and giving him a slap on the back and a special award from the BMA."

Books 
 Patrick Magee, Gangsters or Guerrillas? Representations of Irish Republicans in 'Troubles Fiction''' (2001) 
 Patrick Magee, Where Grieving Begins: Building Bridges after the Brighton Bomb – a Memoir''' (2021)

References

External links 
 Freedom for the Brighton bomber 23 June 1999
 Coming to terms: Brighton bomber's story 3 September 2000
 Brighton bomber thinks again 28 August 2000
 The Brighton bomb – no impact? 2004
 Book review, with full Appendix A: Troubles Fiction bibliography September 2007

1951 births
20th-century people from Northern Ireland
Date of birth missing (living people)
Irish mass murderers
Irish nationalist assassins
Irish people convicted of murder
Irish political writers
Irish prisoners sentenced to life imprisonment
Irish republicans imprisoned under Prevention of Terrorism Acts
Living people
Male murderers
People convicted of murder by England and Wales
People from Northern Ireland convicted of murder
People from Norwich
Prisoners accorded Special Category Status
Prisoners sentenced to life imprisonment by England and Wales
Provisional Irish Republican Army members